Thomas Augustus Watson (January 18, 1854 – December 13, 1934) was an assistant to Alexander Graham Bell, notably in the invention of the telephone in 1876.

Life and work

Born in Salem, Massachusetts, United States Watson was a bookkeeper and a carpenter before he found a job more to his liking in the Charles Williams machine shop in Boston in 1872. He was then hired by Alexander Graham Bell, who was then a professor at Boston University. They were known for the invention of the telephone.

As the recipient of the first telephone call – although coming from just the next room – his name became the first words ever said over the phone. "Mr. Watson – Come here – I want to see you", Bell said when first using the new invention, according to Bell's laboratory notebook. There is some dispute about the actual words used, as Thomas Watson, in his own voice, remembered it as "Mr. Watson – Come here – I want you", in a film made for Bell Labs in 1931 which is referenced below in "The Engines of our Ingenuity".

Watson was an inventor of many accessories for the telephone. He tried to make a signaling device for the telephone, because no user could stand near the phone all day, waiting for the call. At first, he made a hammer, which had to hit the diaphragm, then he made a buzzer. After several experiments with signaling devices Watson made a ringer, and his polarized ringer has been manufactured for 60 years.

Watson resigned from the Bell Telephone Company in 1881 at the age of 27. Using money from his royalties from his participation in the invention of the telephone, Watson first tried his hand at farming. He tried geology as well, he was even nominated for Massachusetts State Treasurer. In 1883 Watson founded the Fore River Ship and Engine Building Company. He soon began taking bids for building naval destroyers and by 1901 the Fore River Ship and Engine Company was one of the largest shipyards in America. It would later become one of the major shipyards during World War II, after being purchased by Bethlehem Steel Corporation. When Watson sold his share in the shipyard, he decided to "turn boy again" and became an actor.

On January 25, 1915, Watson was at 333 Grant Avenue in San Francisco to receive the first transcontinental telephone call, placed by Bell from the Telephone Building at 15 Dey Street in New York City. President Woodrow Wilson and the mayors of both cities were also involved in the call. 

Thomas Watson was married to Elizabeth Watson. After he died in 1934, she continued to live in Pass-a-Grille during World War II and died in a local hospital in St. Petersburg, Florida in 1949.

Watson wrote an autobiography, Exploring Life: The Autobiography of Thomas A. Watson (New York: Appleton, 1926). He was portrayed by Henry Fonda in the film The Story of Alexander Graham Bell, which was released in 1939. 

Late in his life, at the age of 77, upon being impressed with a meeting with Indian spiritual leader Meher Baba in England, Watson was instrumental in helping to arrange for Meher Baba to come to the United States for his first visit there in 1931. Upon meeting Baba, Watson is reported to have said, "In my seventy-eight years of life, today is the first time I have experienced what divine love is. I have come to realize this with just a touch from Meher Baba". Later, though, Watson became disenchanted with Baba.

Watson died of heart disease on December 13, 1934 at his winter home on Pass-a-Grille, Florida. He is buried in the North Weymouth, Massachusetts cemetery. His family grave site sits on top and next to the cemetery road and has a vantage point that looks directly at the former ship yard. He wanted to see his greatest accomplishment in life and death.

Footnotes

References
 NPR clip featuring Watson
 PBS.org Watson biography
 University of Houston: The Engines of Our Ingenuity (radio program) No. 1177: "Thomas Watson". by John H. Lienhard

External links
 Short biography of Thomas Watson
 Associated Press obituary (December 15, 1934): "T. A. Watson Dead; Made First Phone"
 
 

1854 births
1934 deaths
19th-century American inventors
20th-century American people
Alexander Graham Bell
American businesspeople
People from Salem, Massachusetts
People from Braintree, Massachusetts
History of telecommunications